A Life of Surprises: The Best of Prefab Sprout  is a compilation album by the English pop band Prefab Sprout, released by Epic Records in July 1992. The album reached No. 3 on the UK Albums Chart.

The compilation features selections from their first five albums and two new songs, "The Sound of Crying" and "If You Don't Love Me", both of which were issued as singles. Three other previously released tracks - "Life of Surprises" from Protest Songs, "I Remember That" from From Langley Park to Memphis and "All the World Loves Lovers" from Jordan: The Comeback - were also released as singles to promote the compilation.

As well as the popular audio formats of the time (LP, CD and cassette), A Life of Surprises was also released as a 45-minute-long VHS video with a slightly different track listing. The video featured only 11 songs and did not include the title track, "A Life of Surprises", "Faron Young", "Wild Horses", "All The World Loves Lovers", "Goodbye Lucille #1", "I Remember That" or "Cruel". However, it did feature videos for "The Golden Calf" and "Looking for Atlantis". Thus only nine songs were common to both audio and video releases.

Track listing
All tracks composed by Paddy McAloon.

Video track listing
"The King of Rock 'n' Roll"
"The Sound of Crying"
"Cars and Girls"
"We Let the Stars Go"
"The Golden Calf"
"Looking for Atlantis"
"Hey Manhattan!"
"If You Don't Love Me"
"When Love Breaks Down"
"Carnival 2000"
"Appetite"

References

1992 greatest hits albums
Prefab Sprout albums
Albums produced by Thomas Dolby
Epic Records compilation albums